Yolanda García (born 18 January 1971) is a Spanish taekwondo practitioner, born in Andorra. She won a silver medal in heavyweight at the 1995 World Taekwondo Championships, and a gold medal at the 1994 European Taekwondo Championships.

References

External links

1971 births 
Living people
Andorran female martial artists
Spanish female taekwondo practitioners
Spanish people of Andorran descent
Andorran emigrants to Spain
World Taekwondo Championships medalists
European Taekwondo Championships medalists